The Racehorse Owners Association (ROA)  is a British horse racing organisation that promotes and protects the interests of racehorse owners in Great Britain. As one of the British Horseracing Authority's (BHA) shareholders, the ROA play a central role in British racing politics and finance.

History 
Founded in 1945 by Sir Malcolm McAlpine, the ROA is run by a team of seven, headed up by the Chief Executive, Charlie Liverton.

The ROA has a Board of 11 members, with elected Board members required to stand for re-election every four years. The current President of the ROA is Charlie Parker.

The organisation is based in Reading. The ROA is a founder member of the Horsemen's Group, which represents owners, trainers, jockeys, breeders and stable staff.[2]

References

External links
 Official ROA Website 
 Thoroughbred Owner & Breeder Magazine
 The British Horseracing Authority
 Owners Championship Tables

Horse racing organisations in Great Britain